Allen William Trelease (c. 1928/1929–July 15, 2011) was an American historian, author, and professor. He served as the head of the history and government department at the University of North Carolina at Greensboro (UNC Greensboro), and as president of the Historical Society of North Carolina.

Biography 
Allen William Trelease was born on c. 1928/1929 in Boulder, Colorado. Trelease's parents were Helen Waldo and William Trelease. The family moved often and he attended high school in Catonsville, Maryland. He graduated from the University of Illinois at Urbana-Champaign (A.B. 1950); and received a doctorate from Harvard University (Ph.D. 1955).

Trelease taught at Wells College in Aurora, New York from 1955 to 1967. Followed by teaching history for 27 years at the University of North Carolina in Greensboro from 1967 until 1994. He also briefly served as Dean of Faulty and as the history and government department chair.

Trelease wrote the book, White Terror: the Ku Klux Klan Conspiracy and Southern Reconstruction (1971), about the Ku Klux Klan. He wrote entries for NCPedia, an encyclopedia published by the State Library of North Carolina.

He died on July 15, 2011 in Greensboro. A graduate fellowship at UNC Greensboro, the "Allen W. Trelease Graduate Fellowship in History" was named for him. The University of Minnesota libraries have a collection of his papers.

Publications

 42 editions since 1971

References

External links 
 Oral history interview with Allen W. Trelease (dated October 2, 2006), from UNC Greensboro

Year of birth missing
2011 deaths
20th-century American historians
21st-century American historians
Writers from Greensboro, North Carolina
University of Illinois Urbana-Champaign alumni
Harvard University alumni
Wells College faculty
University of North Carolina at Greensboro faculty